The Bangladesh national badminton team represents Bangladesh in international badminton team competitions and is controlled by the Bangladesh Badminton Federation, the governing body for badminton in Bangladesh. The Bangladeshi junior mixed team competed in the 2011 Asian Junior Badminton Championships.

Bangladesh has also participated in the South Asian Games. The men's team and women's team both achieved a semifinal bronze position in 2010 and 2016.

Participation in Badminton Asia competitions 
Mixed team U19

Participation in South Asian Games 

Men's team

Women's team

Current squad 
The following players are selected to represent Bangladesh at the 2019 South Asian Games.

Male players
Gourab Singha
Titon Ali
Wafi Uddin
Mohammad Salman Khan
Shuvo Khandaker
Mohammad Abdula Hamid Lukman
Tushar Krishna Roy
Syed Saker Mohammad Sibgat Ullah

Female players
Shalpa Akter
Shalpa Sultana
Alina Sultana
Rehana Khatun
Bristi Khatun
Urmi Akter
Dulali Haldar

References 

Badminton
National badminton teams
Badminton in Bangladesh